Jack W. Robbins (1919–2005) was a principal prosecutor for the United States in the Pohl Trial. The Pohl Trial was the fourth of twelve trials for war crimes the U.S. authorities held in Nuremberg, Germany, after the end of World War II. Robbins was the youngest and longest-surviving prosecutor for the trial.

References

External links
 Robbins' speech at the Robert H. Jackson Center on 6/7/04 in .WMA format
  Robbins Follows Jackson's Example In Nuremberg Prosecution
 Nazi Doctor Prosecutor To Speak At Center
 Robbins speaks for the Robert H. Jackson Center .WMV format

1920 births
2005 deaths
Nuremberg trials
American prosecutors
American expatriates in Germany